William Augustus Ford (1818 – 11 April 1873) was an English first-class cricketer.

The son of George Samuel Ford, he made his debut in first-class cricket for the Marylebone Cricket Club (MCC) against Oxford University at Oxford in 1839. He played first-class cricket intermittently for the MCC between 1839 and 1849, making a total of five appearances. In addition to playing first-class cricket for the MCC, he also appeared in one first-class match for the Gentlemen of Sussex against the MCC in 1839. Across his six first-class appearances, Ford scored 57 runs with a high score of 28 not out, while with the ball he took 3 wickets. Ford had seven sons with his wife, Katherine Mary Justice. Three of his sons were cricketers; Francis, played Test cricket for England, while two other sons, William and Augustus, played first-class cricket. Another son, Lionel served as the Dean of York. Another son was Henry, an illustrator. His brother, George, was a first-class cricketer, as was his grandson, Neville Ford. His great-great-grandson is the adventurer, writer, and television presenter Bear Grylls. He died at Kensington in April 1873.

References

External links

1818 births
1873 deaths
English cricketers
Marylebone Cricket Club cricketers
Gentlemen of Sussex cricketers
North v South cricketers
Gentlemen cricketers
Gentlemen of England cricketers
Manchester Cricket Club cricketers